Hime is a surname. Notable people with the surname include:

 Albert Henry Hime (1842–1919), British Army officer and politician in Natal
 Charles Hime (1869–1940), South African cricketer
 Francis Hime (born 1939), Brazilian composer, pianist and singer
 Olivia Hime (born 1943), Brazilian singer and lyricist